Iveco LMV (Light Multirole Vehicle) is a 4WD tactical vehicle developed by Iveco, and in service with several countries. After its adoption by the Italian Army as the Veicolo-Tattico-Leggero-Multiruolo (VTLM) Lince  ("Light tactical multirole vehicle Lynx"), it won the Future Command and Liaison Vehicle (FCLV) competition of the British Army as the Panther, but the fleet was put up for sale in 2018.

It has been adopted by the armies of Albania, Austria, Belgium, Brazil, Norway, Russia and Spain. The Italian Army took vehicles to both Afghanistan and Lebanon. In Afghanistan, Lince vehicles have saved passengers' lives in several attacks with IEDs.

Design

The LMV uses modular armour packs to adjust its level of protection to its mission requirements. In regards to mine protection, the vehicle's ground clearance has been increased to 493 mm without increasing the overall height (less than 2 meters); it also uses suspended seats of aeronautical derivation, v-hull under body, and a collapsible sandwich structure in the floor to deflect and absorb mine blasts. Its exhaust is piped through its C-pillars, and its turbocharger is located underneath the engine to reduce its thermal signature. Mobility is helped by a run-flat system, allowing the vehicle to move even with completely deflated tires.  It is related to the Fiat Oltre concept car unveiled in 2005.

The LMV was designed in the 1990s and the first LMVs were produced in 2001 while the UK's Panthers were produced between 2006 and 2009.

Variants

Panther CLV
The Panther Command and Liaison Vehicle or Panther CLV was the British Army variant of the Iveco LMV. The Panther CLV came from the "Future Command and Liaison Vehicle" (FCLV) project. Design modifications were made by BAE Systems to allow assembly at BAE Systems Land Systems' factory in Newcastle upon Tyne.  Over 300 Panthers were assembled at BAE Systems factory in Newcastle upon Tyne under a £160 million contract. It was intended that the Panther would replace vehicles including Combat Vehicle Reconnaissance (tracked) (CVRT) family, FV 432, Saxon and Land Rover Truck Utility Medium (TUM).

The Panther seated four people they were equipped with Enforcer RCWS weapons stations which were developed by SELEX Galileo. This weapons station can be armed with a 7.62mm general purpose machine gun or 12.7mm heavy machine gun or a 40mm automatic grenade launcher.

The first Panthers were delivered to the 1st Mechanised Brigade and a small number underwent hot weather trials in Afghanistan. At end of April 2018, the UK Defence Equipment Sales Authority put the entire Panther 4x4 fleet up for sale with 395 vehicles available.  The Combat Vehicle Reconnaissance (tracked) (CVRT) family, FV 432, and Land Rover Truck Utility Medium (TUM) remain in service.

Other variants
A two-door, two seater is also available.

Since 2015, LMV production has featured a host of improvements: these include a more powerful  diesel engine coupled to a new eight-speed automatic transmission, an upgraded drive line for higher performance and a new air filtration system. The payload of the LMV has been increased by some 40 per cent and it is now fitted with new specially designed suspension units and recently developed all-terrain tyres for a higher level of cross-country mobility. A key feature of the latest LMV batch of improvements is that they can be backfitted to the entire legacy LMV fleet to enhance their capabilities. The internal layout of the LMV has also been redesigned for greater crew comfort, with new seats, a next-generation dashboard and an upgraded hardtop. The internal cab height has been increased by 100mm to create more internal volume and an electronic architecture has been fitted for easier upgrading in the future.

The Russian LMV is named Rys' (Lince Lynx) by MVPS, an Iveco Russia and Oboronservis LLC joint venture company, and launched complete knockdown assembly of Ryses on the premises of the 127th Wheeled Vehicle Repair Plant in Voronezh, Rys' supply chain by different plants firms provided around Russia.

Marketing
As of September 2015, Iveco Defence Vehicles had achieved sales of more than 4,000 LMVs Lince 4X4.
Iveco LMV was authorized by the Italian government to sell to Ukraine for 41 million Euros on 14 September 2014, but never confirmed delivery.

Operators

Current 

Albanian Land Force bought 23 Iveco LMV in 2015, 2 more donated in 2017.

Austrian Army operates 172 Iveco LMV

Belgian Army operates 440 Iveco LMV

Bosnia and Herzegovina Army 

Brazilian Army operates 48 LMV Lince and LMV-BR as of 2021. Ordered 1,464 in 2016.

Croatian Army operates 14 Iveco LMV

Czech Army bought 120 Iveco LMV

Indonesian Army

Italian Army received most from about 2,000 Iveco LMV in March 2013; 3,850 total planned to 2034 
Italian Air Force
Italian Navy
Carabinieri
Guardia di Finanza
Italian Red Cross
 Italian Civil Defence

Internal security forces bought 25 Iveco LMV in 2014 and 20 Iveco LBTP in 2015, more donated in late 2021.

Norwegian Army 170 Iveco LMV on order, last delivery of 62 units in February 2018

Qatar Armed Forces

Russian Army received 67 Iveco LMV Rys' delivered in 2012. Additional 358 were locally assembled between 2013 and 2014. In addition, several hundred Ryses will be delivered to the Russian Military Police.

Slovak Army bought 40 Iveco M65E 4x4 LMV for Special Forces.

Spanish Army — 395 Iveco LMV in March 2013

Syrian Arab Army operates Rys' variant supplied by Russia in 2017.

Somaliland National Army Operates between 2 and 3 LMV donated by Taiwan in 2022.

Tunisian Army
Garde nationale tunisienne (USGN)

Ministry for National Security

Ukrainian Ground Forces — at least three machines captured from Russian forces during the 2022 Russian invasion of Ukraine. Italy will also donate some vehicles as military aid. In January 2023 Belgium announced it will send 80 Iveco LMV's. 42 to be delivered in February and 38 have to first undergo major maintenance and are expected to be delivered in August.

Former 

British Army received most from 401 delivered Panther CLVs, these were placed for disposal in April 2018.

See also 
 Iveco Medium Tactical Vehicle - future infantry mobility vehicle for the Dutch Armed Forces.

References

External links

 Official website
 LMV Iveco Defence Vehicles Technical data sheet - specifications - description - pictures
 https://web.archive.org/web/20110324100350/http://www.kolesa.ru/news/2010/09/10/minoborony_priznalo_plany_sozdaniya_sp_po_vypusku_italyanskih_lmv_video

LMV
Off-road vehicles
Armoured personnel carriers of Italy
Military light utility vehicles
Military vehicles introduced in the 2000s
Wheeled armoured personnel carriers